The Alpine race is a historical race concept defined by some late 19th-century and early 20th-century anthropologists as one of the sub-races of the Caucasian race. The origin of the Alpine race was variously identified. Ripley argued that it migrated from Central Asia during the Neolithic revolution, splitting the Nordic and Mediterranean populations. It was also identified as descending from the Celts residing in Central Europe in Neolithic times. The Alpine race is mainly distinguished by its moderate stature, neotenous features, and cranial measurements, such as high cephalic index.

History
The term "Alpine" (H. Alpinus) has historically been given to denote a physical type within the Caucasian race, first defined by William Z. Ripley (1899), but originally proposed by Vacher de Lapouge. It is equivalent to Joseph Deniker's "Occidental" or "Cevenole" race, while Jan Czekanowski regarded it as a subrace consisting of a mixture of Nordic and Armenoid. In the early 20th century, the Alpine physical type was popularised by numerous anthropologists, such as Thomas Griffith Taylor and Madison Grant, as well as in Soviet era anthropology.

The German Nazi Party under the influence direction of Hans F. K. Günther, recognized the Germans as including five racial subtypes, described by Günther in his work Kleine Rassenkunde des deutschen Volkes (1929): Nordic, Alpine, Mediterranean, East Baltic, and Dinaric, viewing Nordics as being at the top of the racial hierarchy. He defined each racial subtype according to general physical appearance and their psychological qualities including their "racial soul"—referring to their emotional traits and religious beliefs, and provided detailed information on their hair, eye, and skin colours, facial structure, and body types. He provided photographs of Germans identified as Nordic in places like Baden, Stuttgart, Salzburg, and Swabia; and provided photographs of Germans he identified as Nordic and Mediterranean types, especially in Bavaria and the Black Forest region of Baden. Hitler was so impressed by this work by Günther, that he made it the basis of his eugenics policy.

Adolf Hitler utilized the term Alpine to refer to a type of the Aryan race, and in an interview spoke admiringly about his idol Italian Fascist leader Benito Mussolini, commending Mussolini's Alpine racial heritage saying:

It however fell out of popularity by the 1950s, but reappeared in the literature of Sonia Mary Cole (1963) and Carleton Coon (1969). In more recent sources, a small array of anthropologists accustomed with such usage, still use the term.

Physical appearance
A typical Alpine skull is regarded as brachycephalic ('broad-headed'). As well as being broad in the crania, this thickness appears generally elsewhere in the morphology of the Alpine, as Hans Günther describes:

Ripley (1899) further notes that the nose of the Alpine is broader (mesorrhine) while their hair is usually a chestnut colour and their occiputs are slightly rounded. According to Robert Bennett Bean (1932) the skin pigmentation of the Alpine is an 'intermediate white', a colour in-between the lighter skinned Nordic and the darker-skinned Mediterranean. Despite the large numbers of alleged Alpines, the characteristics of the Alpines were not as widely discussed as those of the Nordics and Mediterraneans. Typically they were portrayed as "sedentary": solid peasant stock, the reliable backbone of the European population, but not outstanding for qualities of leadership or creativity. Madison Grant insisted on their "essentially peasant character".

Geography and origin

According to Ripley and Coon, the Alpine race is predominant in Central Europe and parts of Western/Central Asia. Ripley argued that the Alpines had originated in Asia, and had spread westwards along with the emergence and expansion of agriculture, which they established in Europe. By migrating into Central Europe, they had separated the northern and southern branches of the earlier European stock, creating the conditions for the separate evolution of Nordics and Mediterraneans. This model was repeated in Madison Grant's book The Passing of the Great Race (1916), in which the Alpines were portrayed as the most populous of European and western Asian races.

In Carleton Coon's rewrite of Ripley's The Races of Europe, he developed a different argument that they reduced the Upper Paleolithic survivors indigenous to Europe:

A debate concerning the origin of the Alpine race in Europe, involving Arthur Keith, John Myres and Alfred Cort Haddon was published by the Royal Geographical Society in 1906.

See also
 Dinaric race
 Nordic race
 Mediterranean race

References

Further reading 

Historical definitions of race